Pop Has Freed Us, a compilation/career retrospective by Papas Fritas, contains eight songs from their studio albums and nine rarities, and comes with a DVD featuring three music videos ("Afterall," "Hey Hey You Say," and "Way You Walk"). It was released in the summer of 2003 on Minty Fresh after "Way You Walk," a track from the band's third LP, Buildings and Grounds, garnered mainstream exposure in a TV commercial for Dentyne Ice.

Track listing

"Way You Walk" (Tony Goddess) – 3:48
"Smash This World" (Goddess) – 4:08
"Lame to Be" (Goddess, Shivika Asthana) – 3:24
"Flash Lightning" (Tom Verlaine) – 3:00
"High School, Maybe" (Goddess) – 1:31
"Passion Play" (Goddess) – 3:04
"TV Movies" (Asthana, Goddess) – 3:57
"Holiday" (Goddess) – 2:48
"Hey Hey You Say" (Asthana, Goddess, Keith Gendel) – 3:15
"Let's Go Down to the Town Oasis" (Goddess) – 3:06
"Do the Move" (Goddess) – 3:32
"Say Goodbye" (Asthana, Goddess) – 4:05
"Book of Love" (Lindsey Buckingham, Richard Dashut) – 3:17
"Vertical Lives" (Gendel) – 3:46
"People Tell Me Not to Worry" (Goddess) – 3:39
"Questions" (Goddess) – 3:18
"Love Just Don't Quit" (Goddess) – 2:19

1, 14, 16: from Buildings and Grounds; 2: from the Friday Night 7" single, 1994; 3: from the Passion Play 7" single, 1995; 4: previously unreleased (c. 1994); 5: bonus track from international releases of Papas Fritas; 6-8: from Papas Fritas; 9, 12: from Helioself; 10: from the Vertical Lives CD single (2000, Belgium) and Tape Op: A Compact Disc of Creative Music Recordings (2000, US); 11: from the Far From an Answer CD single (2000, Australia); 13: A-side of Kindercore Records Single of the Month, October 2000 (7"); 15: from The Men From O.R.G.A.N. (2002, Italy; originally titled "Solodisco" and credited to Tony Goddess); 17: from In Our Lifetime, Vol. 3: The Revenge of Boston (2002, US) and POPvolume#3 (2002, France)

Personnel
 Shivika Asthana: drums, vocals
 Keith Gendel: bass, vocals
 Tony Goddess: guitar, piano, vocals

 Derek Brain: trumpet on "Let's Go Down to the Town Oasis"
 Bryan Hanna: toms and maracas on "Hey Hey You Say"
 Tom Swafford: string arrangement on "Passion Play" (Swafford and Kathleen Derbyshire, violins; Heather Morehouse, viola; Sarah Thompson, cello)
 Samantha Wood: background vocals on "Let's Go Down to the Town Oasis" and "Do the Move"

Production notes
"Hey Hey You Say" and "Say Goodbye" coproduced by Bryan Hanna. Liner notes by Tony Goddess and Jay Ruttenberg. Photography by Keith Gendel and Courtney Banfield. Layout by Shannon Showers.

References

2003 compilation albums
Papas Fritas albums